Randall Thornton (born December 23, 1964) is an American former football player and professional wrestler. He is also known for his stint in World Championship Wrestling under the ring name Swoll.

Football career
Thornton attended the University of Houston, where he played for the Houston Cougars as a defensive back and free safety between 1984 and 1987.

From 1988 to 1990, he played for the Denver Broncos as a linebacker. In 1990, he was sidelined with a knee injury. In 1990, he was courted by the New York Giants. He left the Broncos in the same year.

In the 1993 CFL season, he played for the Sacramento Gold Miners as a defensive end.

Professional wrestling career

Early career
Thornton trained as a wrestler under Brad Rheingans.

On May 3, 1991, he debuted in the American Wrestling Association, where he lost to Frank Andersson. That same month, he toured New Japan Pro-Wrestling and fought in a "Different Style Fight" against Shinya Hashimoto, which he lost in the second round. He would lose another Different Style Fight to Masashi Aoyagi in October 1991.

World Championship Wrestling (1999)
In 1999, Thornton, under the ring name Swoll, debuted in World Championship Wrestling as a member of Master P's No Limit Soldiers. The Soldiers immediately began a feud with The West Texas Rednecks due to the Rednecks' hatred of rap music. On June 13, 1999 at The Great American Bash, Swoll assisted fellow Soldiers Konnan and Rey Misterio Jr. in defeating the Rednecks' Curt Hennig and Bobby Duncum Jr. On the June 24 episode of Thunder, Swoll made his in-ring debut as he and B.A. defeated Disorderly Conduct (Mean Mike and Tough Tom). At Bash at the Beach, the Soldiers (Swoll, Konnan, B.A. and Misterio Jr.) defeated the Rednecks (Hennig, Duncum Jr. Barry Windham and Kendall Windham) in an elimination tag team match. After defeating a few other teams over the next few weeks, Swoll and B.A. lost to the Windhams on the August 3 episode of Saturday Night, thus ending both Swoll's undefeated streak and the feud between the Soldiers and the Rednecks. On the August 17 episode of Saturday Night, Swoll competed in his final match for WCW as he and B.A. defeated Hugh Morrus and Jerry Flynn via disqualification. Thornton retired from professional wrestling immediately afterwards.

Retirement
After retiring from wrestling, Thornton began working for the American Center For Character and Cultural Education. He is a born again Christian and also speaks for the Fellowship of Christian Athletes.

References

External links
 
 

1964 births
African-American male professional wrestlers
American evangelicals
American male professional wrestlers
Denver Broncos players
Houston Cougars football players
Living people
American players of Canadian football
Players of American football from New Orleans
Players of Canadian football from New Orleans
Professional wrestlers from Louisiana
Sacramento Gold Miners players
Sacramento Surge players
University of Houston alumni
21st-century African-American people
20th-century African-American sportspeople